Andrey Kuznetsov and Aleksandr Nedovyesov were the defending champions but chose not to participate.

Sadio Doumbia and Calvin Hemery won the title after defeating Marco Chiudinelli and Marius Copil 6–4, 6–3 in the final.

Seeds

Draw

References
 Main Draw

Amex-Istanbul Challenger - Doubles